Detective School Dropouts is a 1986 action comedy film co-starring and written by David Landsberg and Lorin Dreyfuss for The Cannon Group.

Plot
Donald Wilson tries to make a living in New York City with different jobs. He reads detective novels all the time, so that his distraction causes him to have various misadventures that repeatedly cost him his jobs. A notice on a notice board draws his attention to the detective training of Paul Miller, whose school he attends. The school is located in a run-down house and the owner Paul has all kinds of debts with various creditors. Instead of getting a decent education, Donald, the only detective candidate at the school, is financially exploited and has to take part in Paul's fraudulent actions to reduce his debts. Both of them accidentally get into conflict with three Italian cheese-making families, the Lombardis, the Zanettis and the Falcones. They discover Caterina Zanetti, the woman who was kidnapped by the Falcones, the woman Carlo Lombardi actually wanted to marry. Carlo has been told in a fake letter that Caterina has fallen in love with another man. The Falcones now want to marry him to Sonia Falcone in order to maintain their position in the Italian cheese market. Caterina can give the two unsuspecting Americans a message to deliver to their cousin Mario Zanetti at the airport so that the wedding can be stopped.

Paul and Donald drive to the airport, have to steal two passports to follow Mario Zanetti on the plane. Since they are being followed by the Falcones, they have to fly to Rome, for better or worse. On the flight Mario is poisoned, so the two of them have to deliver the message. Since Donald lost his wallet when Mario was murdered, he now also becomes a suspect in a murder case. In their search for Carlo, Paul and Donald are constantly exposed to persecution by their families, so that they are constantly on the run and have to disguise themselves as monks, for example in the Vatican. In spite of everything, they manage to get the message across to Carlo that Caterina still loves him. Carlo wants to cancel the wedding with Sonia, who looks "like a beaver", but is blackmailed with the killing of Caterina if he does not marry Sonia. He could see Caterina in Venice one last time, but would have to marry Sonia.

In contrast to Paul, Donald still wants to prevent the wedding. After a short stopover in Pisa, they drive to Venice for the planned wedding. After Carlo and Caterina meet on a canal, Paul manages to free Caterina, while Donald is able to tie up the supposed bride Sonia. They exchange the bride and only when the veil is lifted does Carlo face his beloved Caterina. The families draw their weapons, but see the event in the church as a sign from God, so that the wedding continues. A reward of 25,000 dollars is refused by Paul, as he is allowed to keep what he considers a valuable pendant. Back in New York the two want to sell the pendant and it turns out that it is actually worth 300,000. However, it is not dollars, but Italian lira, so the total amount is not even 175 dollars.

Cast
David Landsberg as  Donald Wilson
Lorin Dreyfuss as  Paul Miller 
Christian De Sica as Carlo Lombardi
George Eastman as Bruno Falcone
Valeria Golino as  Caterina Zanetti 
Mario Brega as  Don Lombardi
Rik Battaglia as Don Zanetti 
Alberto Farnese as  Don Falcone 
Ennio Antonelli as  Riccardino
Giancarlo Prete as Mario Zanetti

Legacy
The film was not successful at the box office, but subsequently gained cult film status. It is noted for its low-budget production values, cheesy '80's synth soundtrack, and being the only film released from the Cannon Group to have lost money at the box office. However, it is also representative of '80 culture at the time when slapstick briefly resurfaced in popularity with American audiences.

Home media
Detective School Drop Outs was released on DVD from MGM in October 2011.

References

External links
Detective School Dropouts at Rotten Tomatoes

eFilmCritic Movie Review

1980s action comedy films
1986 films
American action comedy films
English-language Italian films
Golan-Globus films
Films set in New York City
Films set in Italy
Films set in Rome
Films set in Pisa
Films set in Venice
Films shot in New York City
Films shot in Italy
Films shot in Rome
Films shot in Venice
American detective films
Italian detective films
1980s buddy comedy films
American buddy comedy films
1986 comedy films
Films produced by Menahem Golan
Films produced by Yoram Globus
1980s English-language films
1980s American films
1980s Italian films